The 2018–19 Southern Miss Golden Eagles men's basketball team represented the University of Southern Mississippi during the 2018–19 NCAA Division I men's basketball season. The Golden Eagles, led by fifth-year head coach Doc Sadler, played their home games at Reed Green Coliseum in Hattiesburg, Mississippi as members of Conference USA. They finished the season 20-13, 11-7 in C-USA Play to finish a 2-way tie for 2nd place. They defeated Marshall in the quarterfinals of the C-USA tournament before losing in the semifinals to Western Kentucky. They received an at-large bid to the College Basketball Invitational where they lost in the first round to Longwood.

Previous season
The Golden Eagles finished the 2017–18 season 16–18, 7–11 in C-USA play to finish in a tie for ninth place. They defeated FIU and Middle Tennessee before losing to Marshall in the semifinals of the C-USA tournament.

Departures

Incoming Transfers

Recruiting class of 2018

Roster

Schedule and results

|-
!colspan=9 style=|Non-conference regular season

|-
!colspan=12 style=| Conference USA regular season

|-
!colspan=12 style=| Conference USA tournament

|-
!colspan=12 style=| College Basketball Invitational
|-

References

Southern Miss Golden Eagles basketball seasons
Southern Miss
Southern Miss
Southern Miss
Southern Miss